Garita Kilómetro 26 is a federal inspection station operated by the Mexican government. It is located 26 km south of Nuevo Laredo, Tamaulipas, on Federal Highway 85. It is more commonly known as Kilómetro Veintiséis or just el Veintiséis. It represents one of the many garitas located along the major transportation corridors in border regions. More than 4000 trucks pass through the inspection station each day. The inspection facility has been in the process of renovation since 2005. 

Garita was closed on September 14 2014, due to a Mexican law change.

Nuevo Laredo
Border crossings of Mexico
Road transportation in Mexico
Immigration to Mexico